The International Association of Health Central Service Material Management (IAHSCMM) is a professional association which represents healthcare Central Service (CS) professionals, and is based in Chicago, Illinois with over 21,000 members worldwide. 

IAHSCMM in association with Purdue University provides education and professional certification for central service personnel in the field. These Certifications include:
"Certified Registered Central Service Technician" (CRCST
"Certified Instrument Specialist" (CIS)
"Certified Healthcare Leadership" (CHL)
"Certified Central Service Vendor Program" (CCSVP)

Publications 

Central Service Technical Manual & Workbook, 7th Edition, also translated in Chinese, Japanese and Spanish
Instrumentation Resource Course: Identification, Handling and Processing of Surgical Instruments by Natalie Lind 
Inspecting Surgical Instruments, An Illustrated Guide by Rick Schultz 
Central Service Leadership Manual & Workbook
CSSD Dictionary and Reference Guide
 IAHCSMM also publishes a bimonthly professional journal for Central Service professionals, entitled Process.

Links 

http://www.iahcsmm.org/

Central Service Association of Iowa

Medical and health professional associations in Chicago